Watsessing Park is a park in Essex County, New Jersey, in the city of East Orange and the Watsessing section of Bloomfield Township.  The park covers 69 acres (279,000 m²), just west of the Garden State Parkway, and contains the confluence of the Second River and Toney's Brook.

The name "Watsessing" comes from the language of the Lenni Lenape Indians who inhabited the area before European colonization; it means "crooked" or "elbow".  This etymology might have been related to the Third River, which also flows through Bloomfield (though not through Watsessing Park), and which forms an abrupt elbow near the town's center.

Watsessing Park was designed in 1899 by the Olmsted Brothers of Brookline, Massachusetts (sons of Frederick Law Olmsted, designer of Manhattan's Central Park).

References

External links
 Watsessing Park

Bloomfield, New Jersey
Parks in Essex County, New Jersey
County parks in New Jersey